Samuel M. Weber (born 1940, in New York City) is the Avalon Foundation Professor of Humanities at Northwestern University, as well as a professor at the European Graduate School in Saas-Fee, Switzerland.

Weber began PhD studies at Yale University. Partly through correspondence with Herbert Marcuse he became interested in emerging German and French theoretical debates. He later transferred to Cornell University where he wrote a dissertation under the tutelage of Paul de Man. Weber co-translated the first English-language collection of essays by German philosopher Theodor Adorno.  Since that time he has held professorships in Germany, France and the United States.

In the late 1970s and 1980s he played a leading role in introducing and interpreting the work of the French philosopher Jacques Derrida and the French psychoanalyst Jacques Lacan, both in the United States and Germany. As a writer and editor with German colleagues such as Friedrich Kittler, on projects such as the journal Diskursanalysen, Weber shaped early themes in what would become known as "German media theory." Weber is recognized as a noted philosopher, theorist and critic in his own right, whose work is characterized by fine-grained, deconstructive readings of literary and philosophical texts.  He is also the director of Northwestern University's Paris Program in Critical Theory.

References

Further reading
Peter Fenves, Kevin McLaughlin, and Marc Redfield, editors, Points of Departure: Samuel Weber Between Spectrality and Reading, 2016, Northwestern University Press

External links 
Samuel Weber Faculty Page at European Graduate School. (Biography, bibliography and video lectures)
Samuel Weber Faculty Page at Northwestern University
 Samuel Weber at University of California, Irvine

Continental philosophers
20th-century American philosophers
Northwestern University faculty
Academic staff of European Graduate School
Living people
1940 births
Translators of Jacques Derrida